Ab Morvarid (also Romanized as Āb Morvārīd; also known as Āb Morvārīd-e Bardangān and Āb Morvārīd Soflá) is a village in Bakesh-e Do Rural District, in the Central District of Mamasani County, Fars Province, Iran. At the 2006 census, its population was 109, in 28 families.

References 

Populated places in Mamasani County